Balázs Slakta (born 1 December 1994) is a Hungarian professional footballer who plays for MTE 1904.

Career
On 28 September 2019, Slakta played his first match for Kaposvár in a 2-0 win against Diósgyőr in the Hungarian League.

Career statistics
.

References

External links

1994 births
Sportspeople from Eger
Living people
Hungarian footballers
Association football goalkeepers
Kaposvári Rákóczi FC players
Szentlőrinci SE footballers
Budaörsi SC footballers
Mosonmagyaróvári TE 1904 footballers
Nemzeti Bajnokság I players
Nemzeti Bajnokság II players